Serhiy Ponomarenko (born 18 December 1983) is a Ukrainian former professional footballer.

External links
 
 
 

1983 births
Living people
Ukrainian footballers
Association football defenders
Ukrainian expatriate footballers
Expatriate footballers in Moldova
Ukrainian expatriate sportspeople in Moldova
Expatriate footballers in Belarus
Ukrainian expatriate sportspeople in Belarus
FC Tiraspol players
FC Nafkom Brovary players
FC Smorgon players
FC Shakhtyor Soligorsk players
FC Torpedo-BelAZ Zhodino players
FC Prykarpattia Ivano-Frankivsk (2004) players
FC UkrAhroKom Holovkivka players
FC Dinaz Vyshhorod players
FC Bucha players
SC Chaika Petropavlivska Borshchahivka players